The National Technology Business Centre (NTBC) is a Zambia government agency that supports the commercialization and transfer of technology. NTBC's primary objective is to link developed and proven technologies from various local and international sources with local technology seekers, i.e. business community and entrepreneurs, for the creation of wealth and employment.

History
NTBC was created by the Science and Technology Act No. 26 of 1997 and Statutory Instrument No. 136 of 1999 to promote, market and facilitate technology transfer.  It became operational on April 1, 2002 under Zambia's Ministry of Science Technology and Vocational Training.

Services
Though NTBC is a government entity, it takes on the role of a consultancy in the areas of technology commercialization and promoting businesses development through the utilization of expired patents.

Business Development
Promoting technology business through business incubation and the Business Development fund.

Technology Transfer
Bringing technology seekers and users together to improve quality production of goods and service.

Commercialization of Innovative Local Products
Aiding idea conceptualizing, facilitating product development/improvement, testing, production, licensing, launch and marketing

Technology Audit and Validation
It is NTBC's responsibility to take stock of the current technologies in use in Zambia, both local and foreign, and to validate their performance along with the other relevant government bodies.

Technology Information Resource Centre
An online repository of subscriptions and other resources is provided to innovators, research institutions and the business community.

Advise on Intellectual Property Protection & Utilization
NTBC works with WIPO and the Patents and Companies Registration Agency (PACRA) to add value to Zambian products and innovations.

IDDS
NTBC is one of the partner organizations hosting International Development Design Summit (IDDS) 2013 in Zambia.

References

External links
 National Technology Business Centre

Government agencies of Zambia